The enzyme 4-hydroxy-2-oxoglutarate aldolase catalyzes the chemical reaction

4-hydroxy-2-oxoglutarate  pyruvate + glyoxylate

This enzyme belongs to the family of lyases, specifically the oxo-acid-lyases, which cleave carbon-carbon bonds.  The systematic name of this enzyme class is 4-hydroxy-2-oxoglutarate glyoxylate-lyase (pyruvate-forming). Other names in common use include 2-oxo-4-hydroxyglutarate aldolase, hydroxyketoglutaric aldolase, 4-hydroxy-2-ketoglutaric aldolase, 2-keto-4-hydroxyglutaric aldolase, 4-hydroxy-2-ketoglutarate aldolase, 2-keto-4-hydroxyglutarate aldolase, 2-oxo-4-hydroxyglutaric aldolase, DL-4-hydroxy-2-ketoglutarate aldolase, hydroxyketoglutarate aldolase, 2-keto-4-hydroxybutyrate aldolase, and 4-hydroxy-2-oxoglutarate glyoxylate-lyase.  This enzyme participates in arginine and proline metabolism and glyoxylate and dicarboxylate metabolism.

Structural studies

References

 
 
 
 Boyer, P.D. (Ed.), The Enzymes, 3rd ed., vol. 7, Academic Press, New York, 1972, p. 281-302.

EC 4.1.3
Enzymes of known structure